Riesz may refer to:

 Frigyes Riesz (1880–1956), Hungarian mathematician
 Marcel Riesz (1886–1969), Hungarian and Swedish mathematician, younger brother of Frigyes Riesz

See also 
 Riesz, the fictional name of the Amazon warrior and princess of Rolante— one of the six playable characters in the video game Seiken Densetsu 3
 Mademoiselle Reisz, a character in Kate Chopin's novel The Awakening
 Related surnames
 Riess, German surname
 Reisz, surname
 Ries (disambiguation), derived from the Arabic word rizma

Jewish surnames
Hungarian-language surnames
German-language surnames
Yiddish-language surnames